Stalos is a town on the island of Crete in Greece. It had a population of 868 (2011) and since the local government reform it is part of the municipality Chania. It is 8 km west from the city of Chania and the nearby beach at Kato Stalos is a popular resort in summer that forms a continuous strip with nearby Agia Marina and Platanias.

Populated places in Chania (regional unit)